The Mazibuko M1B is a South African all-electric, battery-powered pick-up truck, currently in development.
If produced, it will be the company's first production vehicle.

References

Pickup trucks
Electric concept cars
Electric trucks
All-wheel-drive vehicles
Rear-wheel-drive vehicles
Upcoming car models
Cars introduced in 2020
2020s cars